John Vardy (February 1718 – 17 May 1765) was an English architect attached to the Royal Office of Works from 1736. He was a close follower of the neo-Palladian architect William Kent.

John Vardy was born to a simple working family in Durham. His early training is obscure. His career at the Office of Works, which demanded most of his attention throughout his life, began in May 1736, when he was appointed Clerk of the Works at Greenwich Hospital. He was Clerk of the Works at Hampton Court Palace, January 1745 to 1746; Clerk of the Works at Whitehall, Palace of Westminster and St James's Palace, December 1746 to 1754; Kensington Palace, July 1754 to 1761.  He also served as Clerk of the Works at Chelsea Hospital and as Surveyor to the Mint.

Vardy and William Kent
His relations with William Kent, his senior at the Board of Works, began about 1736 and remained close. Vardy prepared for publication the classic of the Palladian revival, Some Designs of Mr. Inigo Jones and Mr. William Kent, 1744. He redrew and engraved Kent's drawing of the Great Hall at Hampton Court, and drew up Kent's ambitious designs for new Houses of Parliament, under Kent's direction.  After Kent's death Vardy and Thomas Robinson saw Kent's Horse Guards, Whitehall, through to completion; Vardy published engravings of his redrawings of the plan and elevation.

Private clients
Vardy's routine at the Office of Works constrained his time to devote to private clients. His london buildings have mostly suffered the fate of city constructions and have gone. His most prominent surviving work is Spencer House, St. James's, where, ironically the chief fame is garnered by the very early neoclassical interiors of the upper floor, by James "Athenian" Stuart.

For Joseph Damer, 1st Earl of Dorchester Vardy probably designed Dorchester House, Park Lane, London, begun in 1751-52. He exhibited designs for interiors at the Society of Artists, 1764. The house was demolished in 1849.

Family
Vardy's will mentions his brother Thomas Vardy, carver in Park Street, Grosvenor Square, and his son, John Vardy, Jr. who succeeded his father as Surveyor to the Royal Mint. He remodeled and extended  Giacomo Leoni's Queensberry House in Burlington Gardens, for Henry Paget, 1st Earl of Uxbridge, in 1785-89; as Uxbridge House it survives, housing the Royal Bank of Scotland.

His niece Sarah married the sculptor Richard Westmacott (the elder).

Gallery of architectural work

Notes 

British neoclassical architects
1718 births
1765 deaths
People from Durham, England
18th-century English architects
Architects from County Durham